Two Paths: America Divided or United is a 2017 political non-fiction book by the former Ohio governor John Kasich. The book reflects and ruminates on the former governor's political career and 2016 presidential run, and expounds his vision for America's future.

References

2017 non-fiction books
Books about the 2016 United States presidential election
Books by John Kasich
Thomas Dunne Books books